Mister Model International is a global contest for male beauty pageant which has been held since 2013 . It is managed by TIM Management Group who are also the franchise holder for several beauty pageants for the USA, Dominican Republic, Haiti, Argentina and Nicaragua. They are the producers of Mister Model International Pageant, Men's Fashion Week Miami, Green Fashion Miami and Master of the Misters. Many countries participate in the contest, although in some editions there were also representatives from regions such as Santa Catalina Island (United States), Isla Saona (Dominican Republic) and Islas Fernando de Noronha (Brazil).

The current Mister Model International is Bryan Matos of Puerto Rico.

Titleholders

Countries that have won the title

Ranking

See also
 Manhunt International
 Mister Global
 Mister World
 Mister International

References

Male beauty pageants